Giancarlo Alessandrelli (born 4 March 1952 in Senigallia) is a retired professional Italian football player, who played as a goalkeeper.

Honours
Juventus
 Serie A champion: 1976–77, 1977–78.
 Coppa Italia winner: 1978–79.

References

1952 births
Living people
People from Senigallia
Italian footballers
Serie A players
Ternana Calcio players
S.S. Arezzo players
Juventus F.C. players
A.C. Reggiana 1919 players
Atalanta B.C. players
S.S.D. Sanremese Calcio players
Association football goalkeepers
Sportspeople from the Province of Ancona
Footballers from Marche